XHXO-FM is a radio station on 95.7 FM in Ciudad Mante, Tamaulipas. It is owned by Organización Radiofónica Tamaulipeca and is known as La Súper Buena.

History
XEXO-AM 1390 received its concession in December 1972. It was owned by Jorge Cárdenas González and broadcast with 5,000 watts during the day and 100 at night, later increased to 500. It was transferred to the current concessionaire in 1990 and approved to migrate to FM in December 2011.

External links
 radiostationworld.com; List of Tamaulipas radio stations

References

Radio stations in Ciudad Mante